Anqing (also Nganking, formerly Hwaining, now the name of Huaining County) is a prefecture-level city in the southwest of Anhui province, People's Republic of China. Its population was 4,165,284 as of the 2020 census, with 804,493 living in the built-up (or metro) area made up of three urban districts. Anqing is famous as the birthplace of Chen Duxiu, one of the founding fathers of the Chinese Communist Party, who served as the first General Secretary of the Chinese Communist Party from 1921 to 1928.

History
Anqing was held by the Taiping Heavenly Kingdom for almost nine years, from June 1853 to December 1861. It served as the capital of the Taiping's Anhui province during this period. The final Battle of Anqing, in which the Qing forces laid siege to the city, began in 1860, and the Xiang Army and other Qing forces were able to retake Anqing by December 1861.

Culture
The people of Anqing have a unique dialect that belongs to the Gan Chinese branch and is therefore quite different from the rest of the province, which is predominantly Huizhou-speaking.

Administration
The prefecture-level city of Anqing administers 10 county-level divisions, including 3 districts, 2 county-level cities and 5 counties.
District
Yingjiang District
Daguan District
Yixiu District
County-level city
Tongcheng
Qianshan
County
Huaining County
Taihu County
Susong County
Wangjiang County
Yuexi County

Geography

Anqing is located in the southwestern part of Anhui province, and on the northern shore of the lower Yangtze. To the north are the Dabie Mountains. Neighbouring prefectures are:

Tongling (E)
Chizhou (SE)
Jiujiang, Jiangxi (S)
Huanggang, Hubei (W)
Lu'an (N)
Hefei (NE)

Climate
Anqing has a four-season, monsoon-influenced humid subtropical climate (Köppen Cfa), with chilly, damp winters and very hot, humid summers. Cold northwesterly winds from Siberia can occasionally cause nightly temperatures to drop below freezing (although snow is uncommon), while summer can see extended periods of + days. Precipitation tends to reach a maximum in tandem with the meiyu (plum rains) while wintertime rainfall is generally light. With monthly percent possible sunshine ranging from 30% in March to 54% in August, the city receives 1,831 hours of bright sunshine annually.

Transport 

Anqing has one Yangtze River crossing, the Anqing Yangtze River Bridge. 

Anqing Tianzhushan Airport serves the city.

The Nanjing–Anqing Intercity Railway opened in December 2015, allowing a 90-minute journey time to Nanjing, and 3 hours to Shanghai.Wuhan-Hangzhou High-Speed Railway is also under construction.

One of the bus operators in Anqing, the Anqing Zhongbei Bus Company, is owned by a joint venture between Nanjing Public Utilities Development (formerly Nanjing Zhongbei) and RATP Dev Transdev Asia (RDTA). RDTA itself is a joint venture between Transdev and RATP Dev.

Tourism
Zhenfeng Pagoda, built in 1570 during the Ming Dynasty, is located in Anqing on the banks of the Yangtze River.
Little Orphan, a rock hill in the middle of Yangtze River in Susong.

Sister cities 
  Calabasas, California, United States

See also
Sacred Heart Cathedral, Anqing

References

External links
Government website of Anqing 
City planning website of Anqing 

 
Populated places established in the 2nd century BC
Cities in Anhui
Populated places on the Yangtze River